Charles Gould (4 June 1834 – 15 April 1893) was the first Geological Surveyor of Tasmania 1859–69.

Career

He was born in England He conducted three expeditions into Western Tasmania in the 1860s.

He named many of the mountains on the West Coast Range.

He also worked as a consultant geologist and land surveyor in Tasmania, the Bass Strait Islands and in New South Wales.
He left Australia in late 1873 and died 20 years later, in Montevideo, Uruguay.

His father was the ornithologist John Gould and his mother was the natural history illustrator Elizabeth Gould (née Coxen).

Charles Gould was a member of the Royal Society of Tasmania and an amateur naturalist as well as geologist. He published observations of the distribution, diet and habits of the Tasmanian giant freshwater crayfish in 1870. The species was named Astacopsis gouldi in honour of him by Australian freshwater crayfish ecologist Ellen Clark in 1936.

Cryptozoology
Gould was the author of the book Mythical Monsters (1886) considered an early work on cryptozoology. Prior to this, Gould published in the Papers and Proceedings of Royal Society of Tasmania on the possibility Australian mythical creature the "bunyip" was a freshwater seal.

Publications
Mythical Monsters (1886)
Gould, C. 1870: On the distribution and habits of the large fresh-water crayfish (Astacus sp.) of the northern rivers of Tasmania. Monthly Notices of Papers and Proceedings of the Royal Society of Tasmania: 42–44.
Gould, C.1872: Large aquatic animals, Monthly Notices of Papers & Proceedings of the Royal Society of Tasmania , pp. 32–38.

See also
Geology of Tasmania

References

Further reading

External links
 
 

1834 births
1893 deaths
Cryptozoologists
19th-century British geologists
Explorers of Tasmania
Western Tasmania
British emigrants to Australia